Rudolf Julius Benno Hübner  (27 January 1806  – 7 November 1882) was a German historical painter of the Düsseldorf school of painting. He was also known as a poet and the father of Emil Hübner, a distinguished classical scholar.

Life 
Hübner was born at Oels in Silesia, studied at the Prussian Academy of Arts in Berlin under Schadow, and in Düsseldorf.  He first attracted attention by his picture of "Ruth and Boaz" (1825).  He traveled in Italy and resided for the most part at Düsseldorf until 1839.  In that year he settled at Dresden, becoming a professor in the Academy of Arts in 1841 and director of the Gallery of Paintings in 1871.  He obtained the great gold medal at Brussels in 1851. He died in Loschwitz.

Works 

Among the works of Hübner's first period are The Fisherman (1828), after Goethe's ballad; Ruth and Naomi (1833), in the National Gallery, Berlin; Christ and the Four Evangelists (1835);  Job and his Friends (1838), in the Gallery of Frankfurt; Consider the Lilies (1839);  and the portrait of Frederick III, in Frankfurt's Römer.

To his second, or Dresden, period belong the Golden Age and Dispute between Luther and Dr. Eck (1866), in the Dresden Gallery;  Charles V at San Yuste;  Last Days of Frederick the Great;  Cupid in Winter,  and others.

Gallery

References

External links 

Leben und Werk des Malers 

1806 births
1882 deaths
People from Oleśnica
People from the Province of Silesia
German poets
19th-century German painters
19th-century German male artists
German male painters
Artists from Dresden
German male poets
19th-century poets
19th-century German writers
19th-century German male writers
Düsseldorf school of painting